A member of the Arctic Archipelago, Prince Patrick Island is the westernmost of the Queen Elizabeth Islands in the Northwest Territories of Canada, lying northwest of Melville Island. It has historically been icebound all year, making it one of the least accessible parts of Canada. Located at the entrance of the M'Clure Strait, Prince Patrick Island is uninhabited.

The first known sighting of the island was in 1853 by the Irish naval officer George Mecham, when it was explored by him and his fellow Irish explorer Francis Leopold McClintock in the spring of that year during the Edward Belcher expedition. Much later, it was named for Prince Arthur William Patrick, Duke of Connaught, who was Governor General of Canada from 1911 to 1916.

Weather Station

A High Arctic Weather Station ("HAWS") and associated airstrip called Mould Bay were opened in 1948 as part of a joint Canada-US military effort to support a weather station network. Regular weather observations began on May 14, 1948. It had a temporary staff of between 10 and 40 people. Staff size normally increased during summer months, when the station was resupplied from the south.

During the period of US National Weather Service participation, the site was known as a Joint Arctic Weather Station ("JAWS"). Executive officers alternated between Canadians and their US counterparts. US participation ended in 1972. The station was closed in 1997, owing to budget cuts. It was replaced with an automated weather station at a new location on the airstrip, downhill from the central buildings and observatory. The last manned weather observations were taken on March 31, 1997, ending the continuous weather record of 1948–1997.

The buildings still stand, but as of 2017, most have deteriorated to an unrepairable state. The station represented the only known long-term human settlement of the Island.

Climate
Mould Bay has a Polar climate (ET) with cool, intermittent summers and long, severely cold winters. September is the snowiest month of the year, averaging  of snowfall.

In popular culture
Prince Patrick Island is the setting for a work of fiction, the novel The Lost Ones (1961) by Ian Cameron (Donald G. Payne). It was filmed as the Walt Disney Pictures film The Island at the Top of the World in 1974. The novel tells of a lost colony of Vikings living in a lost valley in the island, which, thanks to the volcanoes on the island, is warm and habitable.

References

Further reading 

 Frebold, Hans. Fauna, Age and Correlation of the Jurassic Rocks of Prince Patrick Island. Ottawa: E. Cloutier, Queen's printer, 1957.
 Harrison, J. C., and T. A. Brent. Basins and fold belts of Prince Patrick Island and adjacent areas, Canadian Arctic Islands. [Ottawa]: Geological Survey of Canada, 2005. 
 Miller, F. L. Peary Caribou and Muskoxen on Prince Patrick Island, Eglinton Island, and Emerald Isle, Northwest Territories, July 1986. [Edmonton]: Canadian Wildlife Service, 1987. 
 Pissart, A. The Pingos of Prince Patrick Island (760N - 1200W). Ottawa: National Research Council of Canada, 1970.
 Tedrow, John C. F., P. F. Bruggemann, and Grant Fontain Walton. Soils of Prince Patrick Island. Research paper (Arctic Institute of North America), no. 44. Washington: Arctic Institute of North America, 1968.

External links 

 Prince Patrick Island in the Atlas of Canada - Toporama; Natural Resources Canada
 Prince Patrick Island  on the Canada's Arctic website.

Uninhabited islands of the Northwest Territories
Islands of the Beaufort Sea
Islands of the Queen Elizabeth Islands
Former populated places in the Inuvik Region